Cyprus competed at the 1992 Summer Olympics in Barcelona, Spain.

Competitors
The following is the list of number of competitors in the Games.

Results by event

Archery
In its debut Olympic archery competition, Cyprus was represented by one man.  He did not advance to the elimination rounds.

Men's Individual Competition:
 Simon Simonis – ranking round, 74th place (0-0)

Athletics
Men's 100 metres:
 Yannis Zisimides – Round 1: 10.51 s, Quarter-finals: 10.51 s

Men's 200 metres:
 Yannis Zisimides – Round 1: 21.51 s

Men's Triple Jump
Marios Hadjiandreou 
 Qualification — 15.64 m (→ did not advance, 37th position)

Men's Pole Vault
Photis Stephani 
 Qualification — 5.20 m (→ did not advance)

Men's 100 metres:
 Yannis Zisimides – Round 1: 10.51 s, Quarter-finals: 10.51 s

Women's 10.000 metres
Andri Avraam
 Qualifying Heat — 34:06.66 (→ did not advance)

Women's Shot Put:
 Eleni Evangelidou – Preliminary: 34:06.48 min (did not advance)

Gymnastics
Women's Rhythmic Gymnastics – Individual Competition:
 Anna Kimonos – 17.512 (38th place)
 Helen Hadjisavva – 16.888 (42nd place)

Judo
 Christodoulos Katsiniorides
  Round 1: – Defeated Erick Bustos  from Bolivia (1:07)
  Round 2: – Lost to A. Wurth  from the Netherlands (1:35)
 Elias Ioannou 
  Round 1: – Lost to Nicolas Gill from Canada

Sailing
Men's Double-Handed Dinghy (470)
 Peter Elton, Nicolas Epiphaniou – 175 (31st place)

Shooting
Men's Skeet:
 Antonis Nicolaides – 145 (30th place)

Swimming
Men's 50m Freestyle
 Stavros Michaelides
 Heat – 23.34 (→ did not advance, 20th place)

Men's 100m Freestyle
 Stavros Michaelides
 Heat – 52.54 (→ did not advance, 44th place)

Men's 100m Breaststroke
 Charalambos Panayides 
 Heat – 1:06.19 (→ did not advance, 42nd place)

Wrestling
Men's
 Constantinos Eliadis – Round 1

References

External links
Cyprus at the 1992 Summer Olympics by Cyprus Olympic Committee

Nations at the 1992 Summer Olympics
1992
Summer Olympics